Zhang Kejian (born July 1961) is a Chinese politician and engineer currently serving as the Director of the China National Space Administration.

Zhang was born in Kunshan, Jiangsu province. He joined the Communist Party in June 1992, ten years after starting work. He graduated from the PLA Academy of Science and Technology with a degree in physics. He worked for most of his career at the Chinese Academy of Engineering Physics. He was made party chief of the organization in December 2007. in September 2015, he was transferred to work at the State Administration for Science, Technology and Industry for National Defence as deputy chief.

In May 2018, he became head of the China National Space Administration.

Zhang was named one of Time magazine's 100 Most Influential People of 2019.

References

1961 births
Politicians from Suzhou
Living people
China National Space Administration people